The Rapid River is a river in Yukon, Canada and Alaska, United States.

Etymology
The stream was published as Sucker River by the U.S. Coast and Geodetic Survey (USC&GS) in 1890. The current name was mentioned by R. G. McConnell of the Geological Survey of Canada in 1888. It was so named because of the "boulder stream rapids that extend three quarters of a mile up stream from its mouth."

Hydrology

See also
List of rivers of Alaska
List of rivers of Yukon

References

 USGS Feature ID: 1408534

Rivers of Alaska
Rivers of Yukon
Rivers of Yukon–Koyukuk Census Area, Alaska
Rivers of Unorganized Borough, Alaska